Pokharikanda  is a village development committee in Surkhet District in the Bheri Zone of mid-western Nepal. At the time of the 1991 Nepal census it had a population of 2,669 people living in 431 individual households.

The cheapest way to get from Nepal to Pokharikanda is to bus and train and drive which costs ₹2,100 - ₹3,000 and takes 21h 53m.

References

External links
UN map of the municipalities of Surkhet District

Populated places in Surkhet District